The 1989–90 Algerian Championnat National was the 28th season of the Algerian Championnat National since its establishment in 1962. A total of 16 teams contested the league, with JS Kabylie as the defending champions, The Championnat started on August 31, 1989. and ended on June 14, 1990.

Team summaries

Promotion and relegation 
Teams promoted from Algerian Division 2 1989-1990 
 CS Constantine
 WA Tlemcen

Teams relegated to Algerian Division 2 1990-1991
 RC Relizane
 USM Alger

League table

References

External links
1989–90 Algerian Championnat National

Algerian Championnat National
Championnat National
Algerian Ligue Professionnelle 1 seasons